Michelucci is an Italian surname, derived from the given name Michele. Notable people with the surname include:

 Giovanni Michelucci (1891–1990), Italian architect, urban planner, and designer
 Roberto Michelucci (1922–2010), Italian classical violinist

Italian-language surnames
Patronymic surnames
Surnames from given names